The Air Quality Agreement is an environmental treaty between Canada and the United States.  It was signed on 13 March 1991 by Canadian prime minister Brian Mulroney and American President George H. W. Bush and entered into force immediately.  It was popularly referred to during its negotiations as the "Acid Rain Treaty", especially in Canada.  Negotiations began in 1986 when Mulroney first discussed the issue with then-president Reagan.  Mulroney repeatedly pressed the issue in public meetings with Reagan in 1987 and 1988

References 

Canada–United States treaties
Environmental treaties
Treaties concluded in 1991
Treaties entered into force in 1991
1991 in the environment
Air pollution in Canada
Air pollution in the United States
Air pollution control systems
1991 in Canadian law
1991 in American law
Canada–United States relations
Transboundary environmental issues